Jimmy Hodge Timmons Jr. (June 11, 1939 – April 5, 2011) was an American politician. He served as a Democratic member for the 11th district of the Georgia State Senate.

Life and career 
Timmons was born in Calhoun County, Georgia, the son of Jimmy Hodge Timmons Sr. and Lucielle Daniels. He attended Damascus High School, graduating in 1956. He also attended Abraham Baldwin Agricultural College, the University of Georgia and Auburn University.

In 1975, Timmons was elected to represent the 11th district of the Georgia State Senate. He left office in 1992. He was a member of the Arlington Baptist Church.

Timmons died in April 2011 at the Phoebe Putney Memorial Hospital in Albany, Georgia, at the age of 71. In 2012, he was posthumously honored with his own highway.

References 

People from Calhoun County, Georgia
Democratic Party Georgia (U.S. state) state senators
20th-century American politicians
University of Georgia alumni
Auburn University alumni
1939 births
2011 deaths